Dhayat Ben Dhahoua is a district of Ghardaïa Province, Algeria. It is named after its only commune, Dhayet Bendhahoua.

Municipalities
The district has only one municipality:
Dhayet Bendhahoua

References

Districts of Ghardaïa Province